Debojit - EP is an EP by Sa Re Ga Ma Pa Challenge 2005 winner Debojit Saha. The songs were composed by Biddu, Ismail Darbar, and Annujj Kappoo.

Track listing
 "Jeena (My Heart Goes Duma Duma)"
 "Teri Dua Se "
 "Tu Dil Hai Mera"   (Ismail Darbar)
 "Tu Meri Arzoo"
 "Aaj Nahi To Kal"
 "Jeena (Unplugged)"
 "Ek Haseena Thi (Remixed By Shibu, Pinto)"
 "O Humdum Suniyo Re (Remixed By DJ Remy)"

2006 EPs
Pop music EPs